Leptospermum subtenue is a species of small shrub in the family Myrtaceae and is endemic to Western Australia. It has thick, elliptical, concave leaves, white or pink flowers and fruit that falls from the plant when mature. It occurs to the south of Kalgoorlie.

Description
It has thin, rough bark and thin young stems that are silky hairy at first, soon glabrous. Flowering mainly occurs from August to October.

Taxonomy
Leptospermum subtenue was first formally described in 1989 by Joy Thompson (botanist) in the journal Telopea from specimens collected by Cecil Andrews, north of Esperance in 1903.

Distribution and habitat
This teatree is found in the Goldfields-Esperance region of Western Australia between Coolgardie and Esperance where it grows in lateritic soils.

Conservation status
This leptospermum is listed as "not threatened" by the Western Australian Government Department of Parks and Wildlife.

References

subtenue
Flora of Western Australia
Plants described in 1989
Taxa named by Joy Thompson